Kerstin Avemo (born October 27, 1973) is a Swedish opera singer with an active international career as a coloratura soprano.

Early life and education
Born in Stockholm, the young Avemo attended Adolf Fredrik's Music School (Swedish: Adolf Fredriks Musikklasser), a school in Stockholm known for its song and choral curriculum. After deciding to pursue a professional singer's career she studied at the University College of Opera in Stockholm.

Avemo debuted with classic tragic roles at Folkoperan in Stockholm as Violetta in La traviata, the title role in Lucia di Lammermoor and Gilda in Rigoletto, as well as in Stjärndamm (Stardust) with music by Kerstin Nerbe and commissioned by the Folkoperan. Her interpretation of the title role in Alban Berg's Lulu at the Royal Opera Stockholm attracted much attention.

Career
Since 2003 Avemo has worked at opera houses in Brussels, Düsseldorf, Frankfurt, Zurich, Paris (Châtelet), Lille, Copenhagen, Moscow, Madrid, Geneva and Strasbourg, as well as the Wiener Festwochen and the Aix-en-Provence Festival.

Avemo has been heard in roles such as Olympia in The Tales of Hoffmann, Oscar in Un ballo in maschera, Ofelia in Hamlet, Blondchen in Die Entführung aus dem Serail  and Servilia in La clemenza di Tito. She also portrayed Kristin in Philippe Boesmans' musical setting of Strindberg's play Julie, and Wendla Bergmann in Benoît Mernier's setting of Frank Wedekind's play Spring Awakening, both premiered at La Monnaie in Brussels.

In 2010 to 2012 Avemo starred in Hosokawa's Hanjo directed by Calixto Bieito at the Ruhr Trienniale  arts festival, Zerlina in Don Giovanni at the Bolshoi Theater in Moscow, Sophie in Der Rosenkavalier in Otto Schenk's production in Geneva, Gilda in Rigoletto and Violetta in La traviata in Weimar, the title role in Lucia di Lammermoor at the Gothenburg Opera and Adèle in Die Fledermaus at the Royal Opera Stockholm.

In the spring of 2013 Avemo sang Despina in Mozart's Così fan tutte in a production of Michael Haneke at the Teatro Real in Madrid. In the summer of 2013, she appeared in the show Schwanengesang D744 with music by Schubert, directed by Romeo Castellucci at the Festival d' Avignon.

In the autumn of 2013 Kerstin Avemo participated in the filming of  Casanova Variations directed by Michael Sturminger. The film will premiere in 2014.

Avemo performs regularly in concerts with for example Bach's Passions, Brahm's Ein Deutsches Requiem, Carmina Burana, Mozart's mass in C Minor and concert arias and music by Britten, Poulenc, Grieg and Weill. She has been heard in a series of European festivals and venues such as the Palais des Beaux Arts, the Théâtre des Champs-Elysées and the Berliner Philharmonie.

Personal life
Avemo is married and has one son and a daughter. She has lived in Paris but is now back in her native Stockholm.

Awards
2001: received Folkoperan's Friends' soloist stipend
2002: received Svenska Dagbladet's Opera Award (Swedish: Svenska Dagbladets operapris)
2002: received the Opera Magazine prize

 Discography 
 CD - Gluck, Orpheus und Eurydice. Wiener Urfassung, in 1762. Drottningholm Theatre Orchestra. Dir. Arnold Östman. Naxos 8.660064 S.
 CD - Handel, Messiah. Freiburger Barockorchester, Choir of Clare College. Dir . René Jacobs. Harmonia Mundi HMC 901928.29.
 CD and DVD - Mernier, Frühlings Erwachen. Dir. Jonas Alber. Cypres CYP4628. (2 CD + 1 DVD).
 DVD - W. A. Mozart, Blonde in Die Entführung aus dem Serail . KV 384. With Diana Damrau. Oper Frankfurt. Frankfurter Museumsorchester. Dir. Julia Jones. (www.amazon.de) last 24 January 2013.
 CD and DVD - Boesmans, Julie''. With Malena Ernman and Gary Magee. Chamber Orchestra of La Monnaie. Dir. Kazushi Ono. Aix-en-Provence. 2008. Bel Air. (www.amazon.de) Retrieved 22 January 2013.

References

External links 
 Kerstin Avemo Operabase
 Kerstin Avemo portrait | Braathen Management web page
 Kerstin Avemo portrait | Gothenburg Opera official web page
 Kerstin Avemo portrait | Royal Opera Stockholm official web page

Swedish operatic sopranos
Living people
1973 births
Singers from Stockholm
21st-century Swedish singers
21st-century Swedish women singers